Potter Mountain is a prominent ridgeline located in the Taconic Mountains of western Massachusetts. It has several peaks; the most notable are the southern Jiminy Peak, which bears the name of the ski area located on its slopes, and Widow White's Peak, the ridge high point.

The mountain is located in the towns of Hancock and Lanesborough. It was formerly traversed by the Taconic Skyline Trail which no longer officially crosses the ridge. Potter Mountain offers expansive viewpoints from several clearings, particularly where the ski area meets the ridge on the southwest side of the mountain. Potter Mountain is sometimes confused with the northern peak of Poppy Mountain to the south. 
 
The Taconic Range ridgeline continues north from Potter Mountain as Brodie Mountain and south as Poppy Mountain. It is bordered to the west across the Wyomanock Creek valley by Rounds Mountain. The west side of the mountain drains into Kinderhook Creek, the Hudson River and Long Island Sound. The east side drains into Secum Brook, thence Pontoosuc Lake, the Housatonic River, and Long Island Sound.

References
 Massachusetts Trail Guide (2004). Boston: Appalachian Mountain Club.
 Commonwealth Connections proposal PDF download. Retrieved March 2, 2008.
 AMC Massachusetts and Rhode Island Trail Guide (1989). Boston: Appalachian Mountain Club.
 "Greenways and Trails" Massachusetts DCR. Retrieved February 22, 2008.

External links
 Pittsfield State Forest map
 Pittsfield State Forest. Massachusetts DCR.
 Jiminy Peak Mountain Resort - Official site

Mountains of Berkshire County, Massachusetts
Taconic Mountains
Lanesborough, Massachusetts